Aegires ochum is a species of sea slug, a nudibranch, a marine, opisthobranch gastropod mollusk in the family Aegiridae.

Distribution
This species was described from Pointe de La Fontaine, GR30, Anse Bertrand, Guadeloupe.

References

Aegiridae
Gastropods described in 2013